The 2015–16 season was Olympique Lyonnais's 66th professional season since its creation in 1950.

Players

French teams are limited to four players without EU citizenship. Hence, the squad list includes only the principal nationality of each player; several non-European players on the squad have dual citizenship with an EU country. Also, players from the ACP countries—countries in Africa, the Caribbean, and the Pacific that are signatories to the Cotonou Agreement—are not counted against non-EU quotas due to the Kolpak ruling.

Current squad

Out on loan

Transfers

Transfers in

Loans in

Transfers out

Loans out

Pre-season and friendlies

Competitions

Trophée des Champions

Ligue 1

League table

Results summary

Results by round

Matches

Coupe de France

Coupe de la Ligue

UEFA Champions League

Group stage

Statistics

Appearances and goals

|-
! colspan=18 style=background:#dcdcdc; text-align:center| Goalkeepers

|-
! colspan=18 style=background:#dcdcdc; text-align:center| Defenders

|-
! colspan=18 style=background:#dcdcdc; text-align:center| Midfielders

|-
! colspan=18 style=background:#dcdcdc; text-align:center| Forwards

|-
! colspan=18 style=background:#dcdcdc; text-align:center| Players transferred out during the season

References

Olympique Lyonnais seasons
Lyon
Lyon